Augrabies may refer to:
 Augrabies Falls, a waterfall on the Orange River in South Africa
 Augrabies, Northern Cape, a small town near the falls
 Augrabies Falls National Park, a national park surrounding the falls
 Kalahari Augrabies Extreme Marathon, a South African ultramarathon
 Augrabies Flat Lizard (Platysaurus broadleyi), also known as Broadley's Flat Lizard
 Augrabies (beetle), a genus of beetle with a single species Augrabies schotiaphaga